Jorge Domínguez may refer to:

Jorge Domínguez (footballer) (born 1959), Argentine footballer
Jorge I. Domínguez (born 1945), Cuban-born Harvard academic
Jorge Domínguez (politician) (born 1945), Argentine politician, mayor of Buenos Aires and Minister of Defense
Jorge Domínguez, Mexican musician, composer of music for telenovelas including La vecina